Events from the year 1998 in Nepal.

Incumbents 

 Monarch: King Birendra
 Prime Minister: Surya Bahadur Thapa, and Girija Prasad Koirala
 Chief Justice: Om Bhakta Shrestha, and Mohan Prasad Sharma

Events 

 1 January – Visit Nepal Year 1998 begins.
 April – First case of Kali River goonch attacks is reported.
 29 June – Nepalese politician Mirza Dilshad Beg is assassinated.
 3–13 October – 1998 ACC Trophy is held in Nepal.
 6–20 December – Nepal won four total medals – one silver and three bronzes at the 1998 Asian Games.
 31 December – Visit Nepal Year 1998 ends.

Births 

 1 January – Sunil Bal, footballer
 26 January – Bimal Gharti Magar, footballer
 2 March – Ishan Pandey, cricketer
 15 May – Anjan Bista, footballer
 31 August – Aashirman DS Joshi, actor
 17 November – Anil Sah, cricketer

References 

 
Nepal
Nepal
1990s in Nepal
Years of the 20th century in Nepal